Leaded glass may refer to:

Lead glass, potassium silicate glass which has been impregnated with a small amount of lead oxide in its fabrication
 Lead came glasswork, glass panels made by combining multiple small pieces of glass, which may be stained, textured or beveled, with cames or copper foil
Flint glass, an optical glass that has relatively high refractive index and low Abbe number
 Leadlight or leaded lights, decorative windows made of small sections of glass supported in lead cames

Glass compositions